Sunil Singh may refer to:

Sunil Singh (cricketer) (born 1987), Indian cricketer
Sunil Singh (politician), Indian politician, member of the West Bengal Legislative Assembly
Chaudhary Sunil Singh, National President of Lok Dal, a political party
Sunil Singh Yadav (AKA Sunil Singh Sajan, born 1981), Indian politician, Member of Legislative Council from Lucknow-Unnao 2016-2022
Gurvinder Sihra (born 1984), professional wrestler known as Sunil Singh

See also
 Sunny Singh (disambiguation)